103rd Air Control Squadron is a National Guard squadron assigned to the Connecticut Air National Guard. It provides theater command with air battle management, radar surveillance, air space control, and long haul communication capabilities to plan and execute combined air operations, air superiority and air strike ground attack operations, and provides state authorities with a dedicated force ready to react to local and national emergencies. The unit is located on Orange Air National Guard Station in Orange, CT.

See also 
 Connecticut Air National Guard

References

Further reading 
 Flying Yankees, a history of the first fifty years of the Connecticut Air National Guard. Compiled by Colonel Carl D. Jenson [and] CMSGT. Edward W. Burton. c1973.
 "The Flying Yankee Squadron" by Richard W. Owen. In Connecticut circle v.2:no.9 1939:Nov. pp. 3–5. About the 118th Observation Squadron.

External links
 Bradley Air National Guard Base at GlobalSecurity.org
 103rd Air Control Squadron

Orange, Connecticut
Squadrons of the United States Air National Guard
Military in Connecticut
Military units and formations established in 1946
1946 establishments in Connecticut
Connecticut National Guard